Colin Peter Furze (born 14 October 1979) is a British YouTube personality, stuntman, inventor, and filmmaker from Stamford, Lincolnshire, England. Furze left school to become a plumber, a trade which he pursued until joining the Sky1 programme Gadget Geeks. Furze has used his plumbing and engineering experience to build many unconventional contraptions, including a hoverbike, a wall of death, a jet-powered motorcycle made with pulsejet engines, and the world's fastest mobility scooter, pram, and dodgem.

Certain projects he has undertaken have been funded by television and video game franchises for promotion, including a spring-loaded hidden blade and grappling hook from the Assassin's Creed franchise, an artificial-turf-covered BMW E30 containing a hot tub and barbecue grill, and a bunker underneath his back garden to promote Sky1's television series You, Me and the Apocalypse. He celebrates reaching YouTube subscriber milestones by staging extravagant firework stunts.

Biography
Furze has said that he attended Malcolm Sargent Primary School as a child until he entered secondary school. By then he had already begun making underground dens and a few tree houses. He became a plumber after leaving school at 16, which allowed him to focus working on tools, gadgets and engineering. Shortly after the death of his father, he discovered the video-sharing website YouTube on which he shared his inventions beginning with his wall of death ramp in 2007.

He and his girlfriend, Charlotte, have a daughter named Erin and a son (born in 2012) named Jake, who is often featured in his videos.

He is helped by his good friends Tom Lamb and Rick Simpson.

Inventions
Furze's many contraptions are publicised on his YouTube channel. On 25 March 2010, Furze was arrested by Lincolnshire Police, for possessing an object converted into a firearm (in UK law a flame thrower is a type of firearm). He was released on bail without charge the next day. This was Furze's third attempt at producing such a device, as the first did not ignite and the second burst into flames.

On 5 May 2014, Furze posted a video to kick off his 3-week long X-Men characters special by designing a set of realistic Wolverine claws based on a pneumatic system. Within its first week it had received over three million views.

On 23 October 2015, Furze released a video showing off the start of a new multi-part build, in which he would construct a Hidden Blade to promote the new Ubisoft game, Assassin's Creed: Syndicate. Furze went on to make the Hidden Blade, a spring-loaded concealed blade that activates at the flick of the wrist with the help of a ring-triggered wheel mechanism, a rope launcher and a winch device, all built onto a frame that fit his wrist.

In November 2015, Furze constructed an underground bomb shelter beneath his garden, as part of a request by Sky1 to promote the series You, Me and the Apocalypse. The bunker contains a corridor and a large main room, as well as a fully functional air filtration system and has an entrance shaft concealed by a garden shed.

In 2016, Furze created a "hoverbike" using two paramotors.

Furze has completed three Star Wars themed challenges in partnership with eBay. In 2016, he completed a giant AT-AT garden playhouse, followed by a full size Kylo Ren Tie Silencer in 2017. In 2019, he completed a moving Landspeeder from Star Wars A New Hope. The vehicle was auctioned off on eBay, with all of the funds going to BBC Children in Need.

In December 2020 he created a 14 metres high trebuchet capable of throwing a washing machine.

In March, 2022, he announced the completion of a tunnel that links his house and his workshop. Lined with metal sheets and concrete, it took him three years to construct. Extensions towards the bunker and the driveway are planned next. 

His YouTube channel has 12.2 million subscribers as of 20 December 2022.

Achievements
On 24 October 2008, Furze revealed a  motorbike that he had built to break the world record of the longest motorcycle. This was done by attaching beams in place of the back.

On 14 October 2010, it was announced that Furze had modified a mobility scooter to give it the ability to reach  in an attempt to enter the Guinness Book of Records. It took him nearly three months to build and has a  motocross engine.

He succeeded in breaking the world record by achieving . The pram was featured in the October 2013 copy of Popular Science Magazine, in which Furze was interviewed about his reasons for having modified the pram.

BBC Worldwide asked Furze to complete the project for The Stig to drive.

Television 
Furze made his television debut by appearing as the 'Mystery Guest' in Episode 1, Series 3 of Russell Howard's Good News, where he showed off his mobility scooter project. The scooter was damaged in transit and was unable to work properly on stage, but Russell got on the scooter regardless and Furze pushed him around on it.

Furze appeared as one of the experts on Gadget Geeks, the short-lived Sky1 series, in which the trio of experts would consult a member of the British public to test an invention idea in the workplace, along with the entertainer Tom Scott and Charles Yarnold. Furze has been 'number one' multiple times on the Science Channel show Outrageous Acts of Science and has appeared on the E4 show Virtually Famous twice, demonstrating his wolverine claws on 28 July 2014 and again, the following year, showcasing the "toaster knife".

He went further afield, appearing on German television with his toaster knife.

He appeared as a guest and "challenge" in the third season of the German tv game show Joko gegen Klaas - Das Duell um die Welt. One of the contestants had to be Furze's assistant for a day and had to test any invention he presented.

Furze's inventions were featured on the 11 February 2020 episode of Great British Inventions hosted by David Jason.

Books 
Colin Furze authored "This Book Isn't Safe", a collection of projects intended for children and adults to recreate at home and spur an interest in engineering.

References

External links 
 Youtube
 Twitter
 Website

British stunt performers
Living people
21st-century British inventors
1979 births
British YouTubers
People from Stamford, Lincolnshire